The Hunslet Engine Company is a locomotive-building company, founded in 1864 in Hunslet, England. It manufactured steam locomotives for over 100 years and currently manufactures diesel shunting locomotives. The company is part of Ed Murray & Sons.

History

The early years 1864–1901 

The company was founded in 1864 at Jack Lane in Hunslet by John Towlerton Leather, a civil engineering contractor, who appointed James Campbell (son of Alexander Campbell, a Leeds engineer) as his works manager.

The first engine was completed in 1865. It was Linden, a standard gauge  delivered to Brassey and Ballard, a railway civil engineering contractor as were several of the firm's early customers. Other customers included collieries. This basic standard gauge shunting and short haul "industrial" engine was to be the main-stay of Hunslet production for many years.

In 1871, James Campbell bought the company for £25,000 (payable in five instalments over two years) and the firm remained in the Campbell family ownership for many years. Between 1865 and 1870, the company had averaged fewer than ten locomotives a year but, in 1871, seventeen were built, rising over the next 30 years to a maximum of 34.

In 1870, Hunslet constructed its first narrow gauge engine Dinorwic, a diminutive  gauge  for the Dinorwic Slate Quarry at Llanberis. This engine, later renamed Charlie, was the first of 20 similar engines built for this quarry and did much to establish Hunslet as a major builder of quarry engines. The quarry was linked to Port Dinorwic by a  gauge line for which Hunslet built three  engines Dinorwic, Padarn and Velinheli. Much larger than the normal quarry type,  gauge  engines Charles, Blanche and Linda were built between 1882 and 1893 for use on the Penrhyn Quarry Railway "main line" between Bethesda and Port Penrhyn in North Wales.

Many short wheelbase  locomotives were supplied to the Manchester Ship Canal Company in the 1880s.

The first Hunslet engine built for export was its No. 10, an  shipped via Hull and Rotterdam to Java. By 1902, Hunslet had supplied engines to over thirty countries, often opening up new markets. In Ireland, Hunslet supplied engines to several of the newly opened narrow gauge lines and also in 1887 built the three unorthodox  engines for the Lartigue Monorail system used by the Listowel Ballybunion Railway.

From 1873 onwards, many Hunslet locomotives were exported to Australia for use on both main line and lesser lines.

1901–1939
In 1901, James Campbell was still in charge as proprietor and his four sons were all working for the company, including the eldest son Alexander III who had taken over as works manager on the death of his Uncle George in 1890. In 1902, the company was reorganised as a private limited company with the name Hunslet Engine Company Ltd. but was still a family business. Following the death of James Campbell in 1905, the chairmanship passed to Alexander III and brother Robert became works manager, while brother Will retained the role of secretary and traveller with a seat on the board.

At about this time, Hunslet was building a series of s for the Sierra Leone Government Railway, design elements of which were included in the construction of the famous Russell a  gauge engine built for the Portmadoc, Beddgelert & South Snowdon Railway.

Following family disagreements, both Will and the youngest brother Gordon left the company and a serious injury left Robert disabled and unable to continue as works manager. The post of works manager was advertised and Edgar Alcock, then assistant works manager at the Gorton Foundry of Beyer-Peacock, was appointed in 1912. Alcock came to Hunslet at a time of change when the industry was being asked for far larger and more powerful locomotives than had ever been required in the past. This was true at Hunslet, which found its overseas customers asking for very large engines. One example was an order for two 86 ton s from the Antofagasta, Chile & Bolivia Railway.

During the First World War, overseas orders dried up. The company, like many others, found itself employing women on the shop floor and engaged in the manufacture of munitions. It continued to produce limited numbers of locomotives, significant examples being lightweight narrow gauge  designs for the War Department Light Railways.

After the First World War, Hunslet was once more able to attract overseas orders and it also received a series of repeat orders from the London, Midland & Scottish Railway for 90 LMS Fowler Class 3F "Jinty"  shunting engines. During the 1930s, Hunslet built its largest locomotives, two  engines, built for a special train-ferry loading job in China – they were at that date the largest and most powerful tank engines ever built. A year or so later, the same design formed the basis for an 0-8-0 tender engine for India. Many other "large-engine" orders were received in these inter-war years.

Other independent British manufacturers failed to survive the depression of the 1920s and 30s and Hunslet acquired the patterns, rights and designs of other builders including Kerr, Stuart & Company and the Avonside Engine Company.

1930–2000
John Alcock, who, following in his father's footsteps, became managing director of Hunslet in 1958, recalled his father telling him circa 1920, when he was still a schoolboy, that his main endeavour for the company would be in the application of the internal combustion engine to railway locomotion. Throughout the 1930s, Hunslet worked on the perfecting of the diesel locomotive.

During the Second World War, the company again served the country well in the manufacture of munitions, but it also built engines, both steam and diesel for the war effort. Noteworthy is its role in the production of the "Austerity"  shunting locomotive. It was an austerity revision of the 50550 shunter design, itself a development of the Hunslet 48150 shunter design, of which 16 had been built pre-war. Hunslet produced 149 Austerities during the hostilities, and sub-contracted construction of almost 200 more. A total of 485 Austerities were built by Hunslet and other builders between 1943 and 1964, of which over 70 examples have been preserved.

Locomotive construction resumed after the war. Important in post-war production was the Hunslet flame-proof diesel engine for use in the coal mines, as well as further batches of Austerity shunters for the National Coal Board (NCB) and the British Army, and rebuilding some older Austerities, work which continued into the early 1960s. The last three Austerities were sold in 1970, one directly to preservation, one for scrap and one to the NCB.

The last industrial steam engine built in Britain was built at Hunslet in 1971 for export to Trangkil sugar mill in Central Java, Indonesia.

The "Jack Lane, Hunslet, Leeds" works was closed in 1995, the last order being a batch of narrow gauge diesel locomotives for tunnelling on the Jubilee Line Extension of the London Underground.

2000–present

In 2004, the Hunslet Engine Company was acquired by the LH Group. Production was moved to Barton-under-Needwood while other operations remained in Leeds.

In 2006, the company manufactured remote-controlled diesel electric shunters for John M. Henderson & Co to be supplied to POSCO's coking plant in South Korea. In the same year, several orders for underground and mining diesel locomotives were completed.

In 2007, Hunslet began developing a new family of locomotives ranging from shunters to vehicles weighing up to 100 tons. The first locomotive of the new class, the DH60C, a three-axle C diesel hydraulic shunting locomotive, was unveiled in July 2010.

The company also operated a locomotive hire business (including a British Rail Class 08 shunter acquired in 2006), mainly of industrial shunting locomotives.

In 2012, LH Group was sold to Wabtec for US$48 million. The company owns the rights to the names and designs of a number of former British locomotive manufacturers including Andrew Barclay, Avonside Engine Company, North British Locomotive Company, Greenwood & Batley, Hudswell Clarke, John Fowler & Co, Kerr, Stuart & Company, Kitson & Company and Manning Wardle. It also maintains and supplies spare parts for those brands. In 2021, the business was purchased by Ed Murray & Sons.

The Hunslet Steam Co.
The Hunslet Steam Co. is part of the LH Group. The company is involved in new-build steam locomotives (including two Quarry Hunslet  locomotives), boiler making and locomotive maintenance.

Related companies

Hunslet-Barclay Ltd

The locomotive manufacturer Andrew Barclay was acquired by the Hunslet group in 1972, and renamed Hunslet-Barclay. It chiefly undertook maintenance and refurbishment of diesel multiple unit passenger trains at the Andrew Barclay Caledonia Works in Kilmarnock. In 2003, the LH Group acquired the locomotive interests of the company. In October 2007, Hunslet-Barclay went into receivership and in November was purchased by FKI (the owner of Brush Traction) and renamed Brush-Barclay. In 2011, Brush Traction and Brush-Barclay were purchased by Wabtec.

Preserved locomotives

Preserved examples 
No. 1440 Airedale – Preserved and currently stored at Embsay & Bolton Abbey Steam Railway
No. 1 Brookes
No. 11 – Preserved and currently undergoing cosmetic restoration at the Middleton Railway
No. 243 – Preserved and currently undergoing cosmetic restoration at the Fundación Camilo José Cela assignment Madrid Railway Museum (Fundación de los Ferrocarriles Españoles), Spain
No. 686 Lady Armaghdale – Preserved and on static display at Highley, on the Severn Valley Railway
No. 1444 Preserved and running at Museum of Transport & Technology, Auckland, New Zealand
No. 1800 – Preserved and running on the Nene Valley Railway
No. 1821
No. 1873 Jessie – Preserved and running on the Pontypool & Blaenavon Railway
No. 1982 Ring Haw – Preserved and running on the North Norfolk Railway
No. 2705 Beatrice – Preserved and running on the Embsay & Bolton Abbey Steam Railway
No. 2868 B&W Engineering – 
No. 3694 Whiston – preserved an in operational condition at the Foxfield Railway though on loan at end of March 2019 at the Churnet Valley Railway
No. 3715 Primrose No. 2 – Preserved and currently undergoing an overhaul at Embsay & Bolton Abbey Steam Railway
No. 3782 Arthur – Preserved and undergoing overhaul at the Buckinghamshire Railway Centre
No. 3783 Darfield No. 1 – Preserved and running on the Chasewater Railway
Holly Bank No. 3 – Preserved and running on the Chasewater Railway
Jack's Green – Preserved and currently stored at the Nene Valley Railway
No. 1589 Newstead – Preserved and undergoing overhaul at the Spa Valley Railway
Robert Nelson No. 4
No. 79 "Plum" – 16 inch , preserved on static display at the NSW Rail Museum, Thirlmere, Australia
No. 2705 –  loco, preserved and currently running at the NSW Rail Museum, Thirlmere, Australia
No. 1168 –  built in 1914; preserved and on static display at Fort San Andres Museum, Port-of-Spain, Trinidad' under the unofficial number "42"

Ireland 
Tralee and Dingle Light Railway, County Kerry
Ulster Folk and Transport Museums, County Down

Israel 
Old Gesher Museum, Kibbutz Gesher

Sri Lanka 

Sri Lanka Railways uses Hunslet diesel shunting locomotives in most railway yards.

New Zealand
NZR/PWD Y class number 542 (Hunslet No. 1444) is preserved at the Museum of Transport & Technology.

See also
 List of Hunslet narrow gauge locomotive designs

Notes

References

Literature

External links

 Hunslet Engine Company website
 The Quarry Hunslet web site
 The Leeds Engine web site

Defunct companies based in Leeds
Engineering companies of the United Kingdom
 
Locomotive manufacturers of the United Kingdom
Manufacturing companies based in Leeds
Manufacturing companies established in 1864
1864 establishments in England